Kolchugino is a town and the administrative center of Kolchuginsky District in Vladimir Oblast, Russia, located on the Peksha River (Klyazma's tributary) some  northwest of Vladimir, the administrative center of the oblast. Population:

History
Kolchugino was founded in 1871 as a settlement next to copper-annealing and wire-producing plants belonging to a Muscovite merchant A. G. Kolchugin (hence, the name Kolchugino). It was granted town status in 1931.

Administrative and municipal status
Within the framework of administrative divisions, Kolchugino serves as the administrative center of Kolchuginsky District, to which it is directly subordinated. As a municipal division, the town of Kolchugino, together with nine rural localities in Kolchuginsky District, is incorporated within Kolchuginsky Municipal District as Kolchugino Urban Settlement.

Economy

The town is well known for its tableware plant, founded by Alexander Kolchugin. Most of Russian tea glass-holders were produced in Kolchugino.

ZAO Kolchugtsvetmet, also located in Kolchugino and founded in 1871, is the largest manufacturer of non-ferrous mill products in the Commonwealth of Independent States.

References

Notes

Sources

Cities and towns in Vladimir Oblast
Vladimir Governorate